Incarnations of Immortality is the name of an eight-book fantasy series by Piers Anthony. The books each focus on one of eight supernatural "offices" (Death, Time, Fate, War, Nature, Evil, Good, and Night) in a fictional reality and history parallel to ours, with the exception that society has advanced both magic and modern technology. The series covers the adventures and struggles of a group of humans called "Incarnations", who hold these supernatural positions for a certain time.

The title alludes to William Wordsworth's 1804 poem Ode: Intimations of Immortality.

Bibliography
 On a Pale Horse (1983)
 Bearing an Hourglass (1984)
 With a Tangled Skein (1985)
 Wielding a Red Sword (1986)
 Being a Green Mother (1987)
 For Love of Evil (1988)
 And Eternity (1990)
 Under a Velvet Cloak (2007)

Themes
Incarnations uses its premise to ponder questions regarding the nature of life. As each character goes from a mortal life to the "office" of an Incarnation, they are forced to contemplate their actions on a daily basis. Each Incarnation may use their office, within limits, as they see fit. This system humanizes what would otherwise be impersonal forces, leading to both extensive considerations of the effects of the incarnation's work and the impact it has on not only humanity but also the other offices of immortality as well.

Another humorous side of Incarnations is the portrayed magic/technology duality. Most series emphasize one or the other means of understanding and manipulating the world, but in Incarnations, each method is equal in usefulness and respect. This leads to a number of amusing parallels, such as competition between automobile and magic-carpet manufacturers. By the future time period of Norton, magic is referred to as the Fifth Fundamental Force, with its own primary particle, the Magicon (similar to a graviton). A few other series have used the technology/magic combined motif, notably Apprentice Adept, another series by Piers Anthony, and Four Lords of the Diamond by Jack Chalker, although that book had an actual technological basis for the explanation of its magic, in contrast to Piers Anthony's work.

Anthony uses the number five extensively. The five Incarnations are associated with the five elements (Death with Earth, Fate with Water, War with Fire, Nature with Air, and Time with Void), and often other items with fives (the previously mentioned Book of Five Rings). There are five fundamental interactions, magic being the fifth. The Llano consists of five songs. In On a Pale Horse, Gaea teaches Zane five patterns of thought, each represented by diagrams of five short lines.

A fourth theme of Incarnations is the multigenerational human story between the Incarnations. Previous characters repeatedly appear in later novels, and by the final novel, every major character is related by blood, marriage, or affair. See the family tree below.

Characters

Family tree

Note: Colors for each of the Incarnations used are from the covers of their respective books.
Note: Gawain II was conceived by Norton and Orlene, but has Gawain's genetic material instead of Norton's (a favor performed by Gaea)

Relationships:

 Zane (Thanatos, the Incarnation of Death) is the lover and protector of Luna Kaftan (Niobe's granddaughter).
 Norton (Chronos, the Incarnation of Time) is the lover of Orlene (who becomes Good) as well as the lover of Clotho.
 Niobe (Clotho, and later Lachesis, Aspects of the Incarnation of Fate) is Orb's (Gaea) mother, and grandmother to Luna (Death's lover), and Orlene (Good).  She is also lover to Chronos.
 Mym (Mars, the Incarnation of War) is father to Orlene (Good) and former lover of Orb (Gaea).
 Orb (Gaea, Mother Nature) is mother to Orlene (Good), daughter to Niobe (Clotho/Lachesis, Fate), and former lover of Mym (War).
 Parry (Satan, the Incarnation of Evil) is married to Orb (Mother Nature), and stepfather to Orlene (Good).
 Orlene (God, sometimes called "the Goddess,” the Incarnation of Good) is Nature's daughter, War's daughter, Fate's granddaughter, Time's lover and mother to his biological son (prior to either of them taking their office), Evil's stepdaughter, and Death's wife's cousin.

In "Under a Velvet Cloak,” Kerena (Nox, Incarnation of Night) is the lover of the original Sir Gawain, Knight of the Round Table, and mother of the original Gawain (Gaw-Two) who was tainted at birth and destined to die early.  Kerena's quest to save Gaw-Two is what eventually leads her to become Nox, the Incarnation of Night and Keeper of Secrets. Gawain (Orlene's ghost husband) is the direct descendant of Sir Gawain, and carries the family taint, so the second Gaw-Two, born to Orlene and Ghost Gawain, is also tainted and destined to die early.  Nox is also the great-aunt (many times removed) to Niobe and her children and grandchildren.

Lesser Incarnations
Hypnos: Incarnation of Sleep
JHVH: Incarnation of Jewish God (assumed to be Jehovah)

Lesser Incarnations serving Nature/Gaea
Eros: Incarnation of Love
Hope: Incarnation of Hope
Phobos & Deimos: Named after the Greek gods of fear and panic. These lesser Incarnations act as assistants to Gaea (Nature).  Their functions are not explained in the books (although presumably they have similar natures to their Greek equivalents).

Lesser Incarnations serving War/Mars
Pestilence: disease in general, but especially consistent with the aftermath of battles.
Conquest: manager of individual  battles
Famine: starvation consistent with battles (although this incarnation has served Death/Thanatos on at least one occasion)
Slaughter: a representation of the bloodshed associated with battles
 The essentials formed a covenant

Cultural references
 The Showtime series Dead Like Me was inspired by the book On a Pale Horse.
 In 2007, Anthony wrote that Disney had sold the TV rights to On a Pale Horse to Touchstone/ABC, which were "filming a pilot program". In 2009 Javier Grillo-Marxuach wrote a pilot for the series for ABC, but it was not picked up.

References

External links
 
 Official Piers Anthony Website
 Incarnations of Immortality Timeline

Fictional family trees
Piers Anthony sequences
Fantasy novel series
Science fiction book series
Innovation Publishing titles
Incarnations of Immortality